

Albania 

Byrek me kungull dhe arre – Traditional Albanian pumpkin and walnut pie cooked usually on Christmas Eve, especially in Catholic families.

Argentina 

Panettone (known locally as pan dulce) and turrón are the most popular Christmas sweets in Argentina regardless of socioeconomic status, with 76% of Argentines choosing the former and 59% the latter in 2015. Mantecol, a typical peanut dessert, is also popular, being favored by 49% of Argentines in the same survey. Sparkling wines, ciders and frizzantes concentrate most of their sales during Christmas season; sparkling wine is mostly consumed by small families with high and medium socioeconomic status living in Greater Buenos Aires and the country's largest cities, while cider and frizzantes are popular among lower classes and large families.

 Vitel toné
 Turrón
 Pan dulce
 Asado (beef, chicken, calf, lamb, suckling pig)
 Clericó (or ), a sangria-like beverage that combines wine with chopped fruit.
 Cider (apple, pineapple) and sparkling wine
 Budín
 Salads
 Russian salad
 Waldorf salad
 Fruit salad
 Pionono
 Matambre
 Lengua a la vinagreta
 Garrapiñadas, dried fruits and comfits
Mantecol
 Sandwiches de miga
Pavita

Australia 

 White Christmas, a sweet slice made of copha and mixed fruit
 Cold ham and cold turkey
 Seafood and salads
 Roast chicken, ham and turkey
 Stuffing
 Christmas cake or Christmas pudding
 Custard
 Gingerbread in Christmas shapes
 Christmas damper – in wreath or star shape, served with butter, jam, honey or golden syrup. Made in the Australian bush in the 19th century.
 Lollies, such as rocky road; rum balls; candy canes
 Champagne
 Eggnog
 Trifle
 Pavlova
 Prawns
 Mince pie 
 Christmas cookies

Belarus 
 Borscht
 Kutya

Belgium 
 Cougnou (with various like cougnolle), sweet bread in the form of the infant Jesus

Brazil 

 Lombo à Califórnia – pork loins
 Rabanada – French toast
 Leitão assado – roasted piglet
 Peru – roast turkey
 Farofa
 Pavê – trifle
 Ham
 Bacalhau – codfish
 Brazil nut
 Arroz à grega
 Potato salad
 Salpicão – chicken salad with raisins
 Panettone
 Crème caramel
 Mousse
 Cider
 Grape juice
 Wine

Canada 

 Bûche de Noël
 Butter tarts
 Candy canes
 Christmas pudding
 Eggnog
 Fruitcake
 Mince pie
 Cranberry sauce
 Roasted turkey
 Shortbread
 Stuffing
 Trifle

Chile 

 Cola de mono – (literally, "monkey's tail") a Chilean Christmas beverage, with aguardiente, milk, coffee, and flavoured with vanilla and cloves
 Pan de Pascua – Chilean Christmas sponge cake flavoured with cloves and with bits of candied fruits, raisins, walnuts and almonds.
 Roasted turkey
 Ponche a la romana – eggnog-style beverage made of champagne and pineapple-flavoured icecream.

China and Taiwan 
 Hotpot
 Jiaozi

Colombia 
Colombian Christmas dishes are mostly sweets and desserts. Some of the most popular dishes include:
 Buñuelos
 Natilla
 Manjar blanco
 Hojaldres
 Brevas dessert with cheese
 Christmas cookies
 Sweet bread filled with fruits like raisins and raspberries.
 Lechona (rice baked inside a pig, with peas, the meat of the pig and other delicacies)
 Tamales
 Ponqué envinado (red wine cake)
 Turkey
 Pernil de Cerdo (pork leg, usually roasted)
 Potato salad
 Panettone

Cuba 
 Crema De Vie – Eggnog made with rum, lemon rind, and spices.
 Majarete – A pudding made with corn, cornstarch, milk, lemon rind, spices, and sugar
 Platillo Moros y Cristianos
 Lechon asado
 Turrón

Czech Republic and Slovakia 

 Kapustnica – Christmas cabbage soup
 Fish soup
 Fried carp
 Potato salad with mayonnaise, hard-boiled eggs and boiled vegetables
 Kuba – groats and mushrooms
 Grilled white sausage
 Vánoční cukroví – Christmas cookies
 Christmas bread (vánočka)
 Fruitcake
 Gingerbread

Before the Christmas holidays, many kinds of sweet biscuits are prepared. These sweet biscuits are then served during the whole Christmas period and exchanged among friends and neighbours. Also very popular are a preparation of small gingerbreads garnished by sugar icing.

Denmark 

 Æbleskiver – traditional Danish dough ball made in a special pan (a type of doughnut with no hole), sprinkled with powdered sugar and served with raspberry or strawberry jam
 Sylte – a form of head cheese, a terrine or meat jelly made from pork, traditionally pig's head was used
 Julesild – spiced pickled herring often flavoured with Christmas spices such as cloves and allspice
 Boiled whole potatoes
 Brun sovs (brown sauce) – a traditional dark gravy, used to cover meat dishes like roasted pork and duck (flæskesteg, andesteg) and the boiled potato
 Brunede kartofler – caramelised potatoes
 Julebryg – Christmas beer
 Gløgg – mulled red wine combined with spices, sugar, raisins and chopped almonds typically served warm
 Risalamande – rice pudding. A dish made from rice, whipped cream and almonds, served cold with cherry sauce (kirsebærsauce)
 Flæskesteg – roast pork with cracklings
 Andesteg – roast duck with apple and prune stuffing
 Rødkål – red cabbage pickled, sweet-sour red cabbage served hot as a side dish
 Christmas cookies – Vaniljekranse, klejner, jødekager, pebernødder, honningkager, brunkager and finskbrød
 Konfekt, marzipan, caramelised fruits, nougat and chocolate-covered nuts
 Ground nuts

Dominican Republic 
 Croquette
 Empanada
 Ensalada Rusa – Olivier salad (Russian potato salad)
 Ensalada verde – iceberg lettuce, onions, cucumber, and tomatoes salad
 Moro de guandules con coco – rice with pigeon peas and coconut milk
 Pasteles de hojas – Puerto Rican tamales
 Pastelon – casserole
 Pig roast
 Pollo al horno – roasted chicken
 Telera – Dominican bread similar to Mexican telera

Drinks:
 Anisette – anise-flavored liquor 
 Guavaberry – a drink from the Lesser Antilles historic Saint Martin natives now a part of the Dominican Republics Christmas tradition
 Ponche crema – eggnog 
 Jengibre – ginger tea with spices and lemon
 Mandarin Liqueur –  Mandarin peels fermented with rum and sugar

Desserts:
 Buñuelos – fried cassava dough balls covered in spiced flavored syrup
 Turrón – honey and almond nougat. Tradition from Spain
 Vaniljekranse – Danish butter cookies
 Fruits and nuts – a variety of nuts, fresh, and dried fruit

Finland 

Christmas smorgasbord from Finland, "Joulupöytä", (translated "Yule table"), a traditional display of Christmas food served at Christmas in Finland, similar to the Swedish smörgåsbord, including:
 Christmas ham with mustard (almost every family has one for Christmas)
 Freshly salted salmon (gravlax graavilohi) and whitefish graavisiika
 Pickled herring in various forms (tomato, mustard, matjes or onion sauces)
 Rosolli (cold salad dish with diced beetroot, potato and carrot – some varieties also incorporate apple)
 Lutefisk and Béchamel sauce
 Whitefish and pikeperch
 Potato casserole (sweetened or not, depending on preference)
 Boiled potatoes
 Carrot casserole
 Rutabaga casserole (lanttulaatikko)
 Various sauces
 Assortment of cheese, most commonly (leipäjuusto) and Aura (aura-juusto)
 Christmas bread, usually sweet bread (Joululimppu)
 Karelian pasties, rice pasties, served with egg-butter (Karjalanpiirakka)
Other meat dishes could be:
 Karelian hot pot, traditional meat stew originating from the region of Karelia (Karjalanpaisti)
Desserts:
 Rice pudding or rice porridge topped with cinnamon, sugar and cold milk or with mixed fruit soup (riisipuuro)
 Joulutorttu, traditionally a star-shaped piece of puff-pastry with prune marmalade in the middle
 Gingerbread, sometimes in the form of a gingerbread house or gingerbread man (piparkakut)
 Mixed fruit soup or prune soup, kissel (sekahedelmäkiisseli, luumukiisseli)
Drinks:
 Glögg or mulled wine (glögi)
 Christmas beer (Jouluolut); local manufacturers produce Christmas varieties
 "Home beer" (non-alcoholic beer-like drink, similar to the Russian beverage kvass) (kotikalja)

France 

 Oysters
 Foie gras
 Smoked salmon
 Scallops
 Champagne
 Crêpes (Brittany)
 chapon (roasted chicken)
 dinde aux marrons (chestnut-stuffed turkey)
 Ganzeltopf (goose) (Alsace)
 Goose (Normandy)
 Bûche de Noël.

 Kouglof (Alsace)
 Thirteen desserts (Provence): The thirteen desserts are the traditional Christmas dessert in the French region of Provence. The Christmas supper ends with 13 dessert items, representing Jesus Christ and the 12 apostles. The desserts are traditionally set out Christmas Eve and remain on the table three days until December 27.
 Walnut
 Quince cheese
 Almond
 Raisin
 Calisson of Aix-en-Provence
 Nougat blanc
 Nougat noir au miel
 Apple
 Pear
 Orange
 Winter melon
 Fougasse (Provençal bread)

Germany 

 Christstollen – Stollen is a fruitcake with bits of candied fruits, raisins, walnuts and almonds and spices such as cardamom and cinnamon; sprinkled with confectioners sugar. Often there's also a core of marzipan.
 Pfefferkuchenhaus – a gingerbread house decorated with candies, sweets and sugar icing (in reference to the gingerbread house of the fairy tale Hänsel and Gretel)
 Printen
 Oblaten Lebkuchen
 Springerle
 Weihnachtsplätzchen (Christmas cookies)
 Carp
 Roast goose, often paired with kartoffelklosse
 Venison – e.g. meat of roe deer usually served with red cabbage, brussels sprout and lingonberry sauce
 Herring salad – salad of pickled or soused herring, beetroot, potatoes, apple 
 Kartoffelsalat (potato salad) with Wurst (sausages) is traditionally eaten in northern Germany for supper on Christmas Eve
 Schäufele (a corned, smoked ham) usually served with potato salad in southern Germany for dinner on Christmas Eve
 Weisswurst – sausages with veal and bacon, usually flavored with parsley, lemon, mace, onions, ginger and cardamom
 Feuerzangenbowle
 Glühwein (hot spiced wine)

Greece and Cyprus 
 Kourabiedes
 Melomakarono
 Diples
 Christopsomo (Christmas bread)
 Pork or turkey

Greenland 
 Kiviak

Guatemala 
 Tamales
 Ponche (Christmas fruit punch served hot with much fruit)
 pavo (turkey)
 Buñuelos (fluffy sweet dessert made with corn with maple syrup)
 chicken (prepared with different stuffings and accompanied with various side dishes such as salads or rice)

Hong Kong and Macau 
Dim sum

Hungary 

 Fish soup (halászlé) various recipes
 Stuffed cabbage (töltött káposzta)
 Roast goose
 Roast duck
 Pastry roll filled with walnut or poppy seed (bejgli)
 Bread pudding with poppy seed (mákos guba or bobájka)
 Szaloncukor
 Cheesy Garlic Bread Sticks

Iceland 

 Hamborgarhryggur – a smoked, cured pork roast.
 Ptarmigan – gamebird in the grouse family
 Hangikjöt
 Oven-roasted turkey
 Möndlugrautur – a Christmas rice pudding with an almond hidden inside (the same as the Swedish Julgröt)
 Caramelised potatoes, Icelandic. Brúnaðar kartöflur (same as in Danish cuisine).
 Pickled red cabbage
 Smákökur – small cookies of various sorts
 Jólasúkkulaðibitakökur
 Loftkökur
 Mömmukökur
 Sörur
 Spesiur
 Gyðingakökur
 Piparkökur
 Marens Kornflexkökur
 Laufabrauð – round, very thin flat cakes with a diameter of about 15 to 20 cm (6 to 8 inches), decorated with leaf-like, geometric patterns and fried briefly in hot fat or oil

India 
Indian Christians in Indian subcontinent celebrate Christmas by enjoying several dishes, such as Allahabadi cake, Candy canes, Plum cakes etc. Some of the popular dishes eaten during Christmas in India are:

 Allahabadi cake.
 Christmas cake – a type of fruit cake.
 Mathri – a traditional flaky biscuit.
 Gulab Jamun – a traditional sweet prepared with khoa.
Walnut fudge
 Jalebi
Mincemeatpie
 Kheer – boiled rice cooked with milk, sugar, saffron and is garnished with nuts such as almonds and pistachios. It can also be made with barley.
 Chhena Poda – a dessert made with Chhena (cottage cheese) which is slightly roasted and soaked in sugar syrup. It is garnished with cashew nuts and served. Chhena Poda is popular in the Odisha state of India. It is eaten during the Christmas season but is available throughout the year.
Ghee cookies
Rose cookies 
Bolinhas de coco _ a type of coconut cookies 
 Chocolate covered fruit
Marzipan
 Dumplings – dumplings filled with Indian spices with a sweet or savoury filling.
 Tarts 
Nankhatai 
 Neureos – a kind of dumpling made of semolina, khoa and nutlet.
 Roast chicken
Dates roll- a type of Christmas cookies with dates
 Bebinca – a dessert popular in Goa which is eaten during Christmas season.
 Biryani
 Stew – stews prepared with chicken, mutton, fish.
 Candy canes
Cormolas
 Aloo Dum
Milk cream _ milk fudge 
Chocolate candies 
Pitha
 Vindaloo – a spicy Goan curry with pork made during Christmas.
 Fruits, such as apple, orange, guava.
 Mixed nuts
Kulkuls
Pilaf
Duck curry
Jujubee
 Cupcakes
 Drinks, such as cider, ginger ale, etc.

Church services are also held in churches throughout India, in which Christmas dinners are held which include dishes such as Allahabadi cake, candy canes, christmas cookies.

The Koswad is a set of sweets and snacks prepared in the Christmastide by people of the Konkan region. South Indian states such as Kerala have traditions observed of home-brewed wine, mostly grapes but sometimes other fruits as well like Apple & Rose Apple; ethnic recipes of slow-cooked beef fry, Rice & Coconut Hoppers, Lamb stew, Fried Rice Indian and Fusion Style; Desserts such as Falooda, pastry, and a whole array of steamed, boiled or baked sweets, often with coconut, jaggery, sugar and spices such as cardamom & cloves (Achappam, Murukku, Tapioca_chip, Sukiyan, Neyyappam).

Indonesia 
 Klappertaart
 Poffertjes
 Ayam rica-rica
 Lampet
 Kohu-kohu
 Kidney bean soup

Italy 

 Panettone (Milan)
 Pandoro (Verona)
 Panforte (Tuscany)
 Prosecco (Veneto)
 Spumante (Piedmont)
 Struffoli (Naples)
 Pastiera (Naples)
 Duck a L'Orange

Jamaica
 Christmas (fruit) cake or black cake – a heavy fruit cake made with dried fruit, wine and rum.
 Sorrel – often served to guests with Christmas cake; Sorrel is made from the same sepals as Latin American drink "Jamaica," but is more concentrated and usually flavored with ginger. Adding rum is traditional at Christmas time.
 Curry goat
 Rice and peas – a Sunday staple, at Christmas dinner is usually made with green (fresh) gungo (pigeon) peas instead of dried kidney beans or other dried legumes.
 Christmas ham
 Chicken
 Pine and ginger

Japan 
 Christmas cake – the Japanese style Christmas cake is often a white cream cake, sponge cake frosted with whipped cream, topped with strawberries and with a chocolate plate that says Merry Christmas. Yule logs are also available.
 Christmas cookies - A Christmas sugar cookie's main ingredients are sugar, flour, butter, eggs, vanilla, and baking powder. Sugar cookies may be formed by hand, dropped, or rolled and cut into shapes. They are commonly decorated with additional sugar, icing, Christmas sprinkles. Decorative shapes and figures can be cut into the rolled-out dough using a cookie cutter.
 Christmas cupcakes
 Crème caramel pudding in Japan - a crème caramel ubiquitous in Japanese convenience stores under the name custard pudding. Made with eggs, sugar and milk, sometimes served with whipped cream and a cherry on top. 
 IKEA French fries 
 Fruit parfait - Made by boiling cream, egg, sugar and syrup to create layers differentiated by the inclusion of such ingredients as corn flakes and vanilla ice cream. Topped with melon, banana, peach, orange, apple, kiwi, cherries and strawberries and whipped cream.
 Gingerbread house 
 Ice cream
 KFC fried chicken – turkey as a dish is virtually unknown in Japan and the popularity of KFC's fried chicken at Christmas is such that orders are placed as much as two months in advance.
 Nabemono
 Poached egg salad
 Shōyu ramen
 Tamagoyaki - Japanese Omelette
 Yakiniku

Korea 
 Gogigui
 Korean royal cuisine

Lithuania 
 Twelve-dish Christmas Eve supper – twelve dishes representing the twelve Apostles or twelve months of the year – plays the main role in Lithuanian Christmas tradition. The traditional dishes are served on December 24.
 Poppy milk (aguonų pienas)
 Slizikai ( or kūčiukai) – slightly sweet small pastries made from leavened dough and poppy seed
 Auselės (Deep fried dumplings)
 Herring with carrots (silkė su morkomis)
 Herring with mushrooms (silkė su grybais)
 Cranberry Kissel -  thickened & sweetened juice normally served warm

Malaysia 
 Bolo Rei – a type of cake
 Chap chye – a vegetable stew
 Steamboat – a hotpot dish for communal
 Devil's curry – from the Eurasian tradition
 Egg salad 
 Vindaloo – a spicy Goan curry made usually with pork
 Semur (Indonesian stew)
 Christmas pudding
 Candy canes
 Kue semprong
 Pineapple tart
 Christmas cake
 Jiaozi

Malta 

 Panettone – from the Italian tradition
 Fruitcake – from British Influence
 Christmas/Yule log (cake) – a log (similar to a tree's) that is made from chocolate and candied fruits
 Mince Pies – from British Influence
 Timpana – traditionally served as a starter
 Roast Turkey – from British Influence

Mexico 

 Meat
 Roasted turkey – stuffed, roasted turkey served with gravy.
 Glazed ham – ham glazed with honey or sugar dressed with cherries and pineapples.
 Jamón (Spanish Dry-Cured Ham)
 Lechon
 Seafood
 Bacalao – cod Basque style. Traditionally eaten in the central and southern states of Mexico.
 Shrimp – cocktail or prepared in Torrejas (dried shrimp pancakes)
 Octopus – cocktail
 Crab
 Stews
 Menudo – a Christmas morning tradition in northwestern states, Menudo is a tripe and hominy soup. Menudo is often prepared the night before (Christmas Eve) as its cooking time can take up to 5 hours.
 Pozole – hominy soup with added pork
 Salads & other side dishes
 Tamales – can sometimes replace the traditional turkey or Bacalao with romeritos, particularly in northern and southern parts of Mexico.
 Ensalada Navideña – Christmas salad with apples, raisins, pecans, and marshmallows.
 Ensalada de Noche Buena – Christmas Eve salad
 Ensalada Rusa – potato salad, particularly popular in northern states.
 Romeritos – also a Christmas tradition of the central region, romeritos are small green leaves similar to Rosemary mixed generally with mole and potatoes.
 Sweets
 Buñuelo – fried sweet pastry
 Capirotada – bread pudding
 Turrón
 Cocada – coconut candy
 Volteado de piña – pineapple upside-down cake. Turned-over cake with cherries and pineapples.
 Carlota de Chocolate – cake
 Mantecados and polvorones – crumbly cakes
 Marzipan, almond cakes
 Pan dulce – sweet rolls
 Churros
 Fresh Fruit
 Tejocotes
 Guayabas
 Caña de azucar
 Drinks
 Champurrado – thick hot chocolate
 Chocolate – hot chocolate
 Cidra – apple cider
 Atole – corn based drink
 Rompope – similar to eggnog
 Ponche Navideño – a hot, sweet drink made with apples, sugar cane, prunes and tejocotes. For grown-ups, ponche is never complete without its "piquete" – either tequila or rum

Netherlands 
 Banket
 Chocolate coin
 Chocolate letter
 Kruidnoten
 Mandarin orange
 Marzipan
 Mixed spice
 Mulled wine
 Oliebol
 Pepernoot
 Speculaas

New Zealand 

 Cherries
 Christmas pudding
 Christmas mince pies
 Ham
 Hangi
 Lamb
 Lollies such as candy canes
 Pavlova
 Peanuts
 Potato salad
 Seafood
 Strawberries
 Trifle
 Turkey
 Wine

Norway 

 Akevitt – Akvavit, a spirit flavored with spices like caraway and aniseed
 Gløgg – mulled wine
 Julepølse – pork sausage made with powdered ginger, cloves, mustard seeds and nutmeg. Served steamed or roasted.
 Lutefisk – fish preserved with lye that has been washed and boiled
 Pinnekjøtt/Pinnekjøt – salted, dried, and sometimes smoked lamb's ribs which are rehydrated and then steamed, traditionally over birch branches
 Svineribbe – pork belly roasted whole with the skin on. Usually served with red or pickled cabbage, gravy and boiled potatoes. 
 Julegrøt – Christmas rice porridge with an almond hidden inside
 Julebrus – Norwegian soft drink, usually with a festive label on the bottle. It is brewed by most Norwegian breweries, as a Christmas drink for minors.
 Julekake – Norwegian yeast cake with dried fruits and spices
 Sossiser – small Christmas sausages
 Medisterkaker – large meatballs made from a mix of pork meat and pork fat
 Raudkål/Rødkål – sweet and sour red cabbage, as a side dish
 Kålrabistappe/Kålrotstappe – Purée of rutabaga, as a side dish
 Peparkake/Pepperkake – gingerbread-like spice cookies flavoured with black pepper
 Lussekatter – St. Lucia Buns with saffron
 Multekrem – a dessert consisting of cloudberries and whipped cream
 Riskrem – Risalamande

Panama 

 Arroz con Pollo
 Tamales
 Ham
 Turkey
 Grapes
 Fruit cake
 Egg nog
 Potato salad
 Pan de Rosca
 Pan Bon
 Spaghetti

Paraguay 
 Apple cider
 Beef Tongue sometimes covered in vinaigrette
 Cider
 Clericó (citric alcoholic Drink made out of a mix of fruits and wine)
 Roasted chicken
 Potato salad
 Roast pork
 Sopa paraguaya

Philippines 

 Bibingka – traditional dessert made with rice flour, sugar, clarified butter and coconut milk. baked in layers and topped with butter and sugar.
 Caldereta
 Champorado
 Churro
 Crema de fruta
 Embutido
 Ham
 Hamonado
 Kinutil
 Lechon
 Mechado
 Menudo
 Morcon
 Pancit – Filipino style noodle dish made with sliced meat and vegetables
 Puto bumbong – a purple-coloured Filipino dessert made of sweet rice cooked in hollow bamboo tubes placed on a special steamer-cooker. When cooked, they are spread with margarine and sprinkled with sugar and grated coconut.
 Queso de bola (edam cheese)
 Salads (either fruit, coconut or garden)
 Tsokolate
 Ube halaya

Poland 
12 dishes are served as a reminder of the 12 Apostles on Christmas Eve, 24 December. Polish people don't eat meat on this day, instead they choose from variety of fish and vegetable dishes. The meal begins when the first star is seen.

 Barszcz (beetroot soup) with uszka (small dumplings) - a classic Polish Christmas starter.
 Pierogi with sauerkraut and forest mushrooms; filled with cottage cheese and potatoes
 Zupa rybna – fish soup
 Żurek – soup made of soured rye flour and meat
 Zupa grzybowa – mushroom soup made of various forest mushrooms
 Bigos – savory stew of cabbage and meat
 Kompot – traditional drink a light, refreshing drink most often made of dried or fresh fruit boiled in water with sugar and left to cool and infuse.
 Gołąbki – cabbage rolls
 Pieczarki marynowane – marinated mushrooms
 Kartofle gotowane – simple boiled potatoes sparkled with parsley or dill
 Kulebiak – with fish or cabbage and wild mushrooms filling
 Ryba smażona or ryba po grecku – fried fish laid under lyers of fried shredded carrots, onions, root celery and leek
 Sałatka jarzynowa – salad made with boiled potatoes and carrots with fresh peas, sweetcorn, dill cucumber, and boiled egg, mixed with mayonnaise.
 Łamaniec – type of flat and rather hard pancake that is soaked in warm milk with poppy seeds. Eaten in eastern regions such as around * Białystok
 Makowiec – poppy seed roll

Portugal 

 Bacalhau – codfish
 Cabrito assado – roasted goat
 Borrego assado – roasted lamb
 Polvo cozido – boiled octopus
 Carne de Vinha d' Alhos – mainly served in Madeira – pork dish
 Bolo de mel – mainly served in Madeira - Cake made with molasses
 Bolo Rei (king cake) – a beautifully decorated fluffy fruitcake
 Bolo-Rei escangalhado (broken king cake) – it is like the first one, but has also cinnamon and chilacayote jam (doce de gila)
 Bolo-Rainha (queen cake) – similar to Bolo-Rei, but with only nuts, raisins and almonds
 Bolo-Rei de chocolate – it is like the Bolo-Rei, but has less (or no) fruit, nuts, chilacayote jam and many chocolate chips
 Broa castelar – a small, soft and thin cake made of sweet potato and orange
 Fatias douradas – slices of pan bread, soaked in egg with sugar, fried and sprinkled with powdered sugar and cinnamon
 Rabanadas – they are like fatias douradas, but made with common bread
 Aletria – composed of pasta, milk, butter, sugar, eggs, lemon peel, cinnamon powder and salt 
 Formigos – a delicious dessert made with sugar, eggs, pieces of bread, almonds, port wine and cinnamon powder
 Filhós / Filhozes / Filhoses – depending on the region, they may be thin or fluffy pieces of a fried dough made of eggs, honey, orange, lemon, flour and anise, sprinkled - or not with icing sugar
 Coscorões – thin squares of a fried orange flavoured dough
 Azevias de grão, batata-doce ou gila – deep fried thin dough pastries filled with a delicious cream made of chickpea, sweet potato or chilacayote, powdered with sugar and cinnamon
 Tarte de amêndoa – almond pie
 Tronco de Natal – Christmas log – a Swiss roll, resembling a tree's trunk, filled with chocolate cream, decorated with chocolate and mini – 2 cm Christmas trees
 Lampreia de ovos – a sweet made of eggs, well decorated
 Sonhos – an orange flavoured fried yeast dough, powdered with icing sugar
 Velhoses – they are like the sonhos, but made with pumpkin
 Bolo de Natal – Christmas cake
 Pudim de Natal – Christmas pudding, similar to flan
 Vinho quente – mulled wine made with boiled wine, egg yolk, sugar and cinnamon
 Turkey – on the island of Terceira, turkey has recently taken over as the traditional Christmas dish over Bacalhau, due to the influence of American culture on the island, home to the United States Air Force's 65th Air Base Wing.

Puerto Rico (U.S.) 
 Arroz con gandules – yellow-rice, pigeon peas, olives, capers, pieces of pork, spices and sofrito cooked in the same pot.
 Escabeche – pickled green bananas or cassava and chicken gizzards.
 Macaroni salad – with canned tuna and peppers.
 Morcilla – blood sausage.
 Pasteles – Puerto Rican tamle made from milk, broth, root vegetables, squash, green banana, plantain dough, stuffed with meat, and wrapped in banana leaves. 
 Hallaca – tamale made from grated cassava and stuffed with meat wrapped in banana leaves.
 Pastelón – sweet plantain "lasagna".
 Pig roast – Puerto Rico is famous for their pig roast. It is also a part (along with arroz con gandules) of their national dish.
 Potato salad – most commonly made with apples, chorizo and hard-boiled eggs. Potatoes are sometimes replaced with cassava.

Drinks:
 Bilí – Spanish limes or cherries fermented in rum with spices, brown sugar, citrus peels, bay leaves, avocado leaves, often cucumber, ginger, and coconut shells. 
 Coquito – spiced coconut eggnog.
 Coquito de guayaba - spiced guava eggnog with cream cheese or coconut milk added. 
 Piña colada
 Rum punch – rum, orange liqueur, grenadine, ginger ale, grapefruit juice served with fruit, lemon and lime slices.
 La Danza – champagne with passion fruit juice, orange liqueur, lime juice, lemon juice, and strawberry juice.

Dessert:
 Arroz con dulce – Spiced coconut and raisin rice pudding.
 Bread pudding – soaked in coconut milk and served with a guava rum sauce.
 Dulce de cassabanana – musk cucumber cooked in syrup topped with walnuts and sour cream on the side.
 Dulce de papaya con queso – Fermented green papaya with spices and sugar syrup served with ausubal cheese or fresh white cheese.
 Flancocho – Crème caramel with a layer of cream cheese and Puerto Rican style spongecake underneath.
 Majarete – rice and coconut custard. Made with coconut cream, marshmallows, milk, rice flour, sugar, vanilla and sour orange leaves with cinnamon served on top.
 Rum cake
 Tembleque – a pudding made with cornstarch, coconut cream, sugar, milk, orange blossom water and coconut milk.
 Turrón – Sesame brittle or almond brittle.
Mantecaditos – Puerto Rican shortbread cookies. Made with shortening, coconut butter, flour, almond flour, vanilla, nutmeg and almond extract. They are usually filled with guava jam or pineapple jam in the middle.
Natilla – Milk, coconut cream and egg yolk custard made with additional cinnamon, cornstarch, sugar, vanilla, lemon zest and orange blossom water. Served in individual ramekins with cinnamon sprinkled on top.

Romania 
Romanian Christmas foods are mostly pork-based dishes. Five days before Christmas, Romanians are celebrating the Ignat Day, a religious holy day dedicated to the Holy Martyr Ignatius Theophorus, associated with a practice that takes place especially on villages scattered around the country: the ritual of slaughtering the pigs. And they are using everything from the pigs: from their blood to their ears. Five days later their tables are filled not only with generous pork roasts but also with:
 Piftie – pork jelly, made only with pork meat, vegetables and garlic
 Lebăr – liver sausages, a local variety of liverwurst
 Caltaboș – sausages made from organs
 Cârnaţi – pork-based sausages
 Sângerete – blood sausages
 Tobă – head cheese made from various cuttings of pork, liver boiled, diced and "packed" in pork stomach like a salami
 Sarmale – rolls of cabbage pickled in brine and filled with meat and rice (see sarma)
 Salată de boeuf – a more recent dish, but highly popular, this type of salad uses boiled vegetables and meat (beef, poultry, even ham). It can include potatoes, carrots, pickled red peppers and cucumbers, egg whites bits. Everything is mixed together with mayonnaise and mustard.
Cozonac, the Romanian equivalent of panettone or sweet bread.
 Strong spirits: Palinka, Rachiu, Ţuică

Russia 
 Borscht
 Kutya

Samoa, Tonga and Tuvalu 
 Puaa umu

San Marino

 Bustrengo

Serbia 

 Česnica – Christmas soda bread with a silver coin to bring health and good luck baked in the bread.
 Koljivo – boiled wheat which is used liturgically in the Eastern Orthodox and Greek Catholic Churches.
 Riblja čorba for Christmas Eve

South Africa 
Christmas is in the summer time in South Africa, so lots of summer fruits like Watermelon and cantaloupes are enjoyed around the time. Popular desserts include trifle, melktert and peppermint crisp tart. People in South Africa love to Braai, and would do that for Christmas or New Year's Day.
Beef tongue
Gammon
Potato salad
Garden Salad
Turducken
Turkey
Braaivleis
Boerewors
Potjiekos
Breyani
Bobotie
Meatballs
Fried chicken
Trifle
Fruitcake
Christmas pudding
Ice cream
Melktert
Peppermint crisp tart – fridge tart made with peppermint crisp, caramel treat and tennis biscuits
Yogurt tart – fridge tart
Cookies
Hertzoggies
Lamingtons
Watermelon
Melon
Mango
Pineapple
Strawberries
 Peanuts
 Lollies such as candy canes

Spain 
 Jamón, jamón ibérico (Spanish dry-cured ham).
 Fish: oven gilt-head bream, oven sea bass, elvers.
 Seafood: Langostinos (king prawn), Shrimp,Lobster, Crab.
 Meat: Roasted turkey, Roasted lamb.
 Sweets
 Turrón
 Yema – egg-based dessert
 Mantecados and polvorones – crumbly cakes
 Marzipan – almond cakes
 King cake known as roscón de Reyes in Spanish and tortell in Catalan.
 Frutas de Aragón - a confit of fruit covered in chocolate
 Peladillas - sugared almonds
 Churros

Sweden 

 Julbord - Christmas smorgasbord ("Christmas table"), a catch-all term for all the dishes served during Christmas Eve:
 Köttbullar – Swedish meatballs
 Julskinka – Christmas ham
 Dopp i grytan ("dipping in the kettle") – dipping bread slices in the ham broth after boiling the Christmas ham.
 Prinskorv – small hot dog sausages
 Fläskkorv – big pork sausage
 Isterband – smoked fresh pork sausage
 Revbensspjäll – spare ribs
 Inlagd sill – pickled herring (usually of different types)
 Gravad lax – lox
 Janssons frestelse ("Jansson's Temptation") – warm, scalloped potato casserole with anchovies
 Vörtlimpa – Swedish rye bread with grated orange peel made for Christmas, with or without raisins.
 Knäckebröd – dry crisp bread
 Rödkål – sweet and sour red cabbage, as a side dish
 Grönkål – sweet and sour kale as a side dish
 Brunkål ("brown cabbage") – cabbage flavoured with syrup hence the name
 Rödbetor – sliced beet root
 An array of cheeses – bondost, herrgårdsost, prästost, mesost (hard goat milk cheese)
 Lutfisk – lye-fish (whitefish) that has been boiled served with white gravy
 Julmust – a traditional, very sweet, stout-like, Christmas soft drink, originally intended as an alternative to alcohol beverage called Mumma
 Glögg – mulled wine
 Knäck or Christmas Butterscotch – Christmas toffee
 Pepparkakor (Gingerbread) – brown cookies flavoured with a variety of traditional Christmas spices
 Julost – Christmas cheese
 Julgröt – Christmas rice pudding with an almond hidden inside
 Lussekatter – Saint Lucy saffron buns
 Limpa bread – orange and rye spice bread

Trinidad and Tobago 
In Trinidad and Tobago traditional meals consists of generous helpings of baked ham, pastelles, black fruit cake, sweet breads, along with traditional drinks such as sorrel, ginger beer, and ponche de crème. The ham is the main item on the Christmas menu with sorrel to accompany it.
Christmas ham
Sorrel
Pastelles also known as Hallacas
Ponche de crème – a version of eggnog
Black cake

Ukraine 
Orthodox and Roman Catholic Christians in Ukraine traditionally have two Christmas dinners. The first is a Lent Dinner, it is held on the January 6 and should consist of meatless dishes. The second is a Christmas Festive dinner held on January 7, when the meat dishes and alcohol are already allowed on the table. The dinner normally has 12 dishes which represent Jesus's 12 disciples. Both Christmas dinners traditionally include a number of authentic Ukrainian dishes, which have over thousand-year history and date back to pagan times.

 Kutya 
 Uzvar
 Varenyky 
 Borshch
 Deruny
 Pampushky
Holubtsi

United Kingdom 

In the United Kingdom, what is now regarded as the traditional meal consists of roast turkey with cranberry sauce, served with roast potatoes and parsnips and other vegetables, followed by Christmas pudding, a heavy steamed pudding made with dried fruit, suet, and very little flour. Other roast meats may be served, and in the nineteenth century the traditional roast was goose. The same carries over to Ireland with some variations.

 Beef Wellington (alternative main course)
 Brandy butter
 Bread sauce
 Brussels sprouts
 Candy canes
 Chocolate yule log
 Christmas cake
 Christmas ham (usually a honey or marmalade glazed roast or boiled gammon joint)
 Christmas pudding
 Cranberry sauce
 Devils on horseback
 Dundee cake (traditional Scottish fruit cake)
 Gingerbread
 Gravy
 Hot chocolate
 Mince pies
 Mulled wine
 Nut roast (a popular vegetarian alternative)
 Pigs in blankets (Chipolata sausages wrapped in bacon)
 Roast turkey
 Roast beef
 Roasted chestnuts
 Roast duck
 Roast goose
 Roast pheasant
 Roast parsnips and carrots
 Roast potatoes (occasionally roasted with goose or duck fat)
 Spiced beef (traditionally served in Ireland and Northern Ireland)
 Stuffing
 Trifle
 Tunis Cake
 Twelfth Night Cake (traditionally eaten on the final day of Christmas)

United States (mainland) 

 Apple cider
 Boiled custard
 Candy canes
 Champagne, or sparkling apple cider
 Chocolate fudge
 Christmas cookies
 Cranberry sauce
 Eggnog
 Fish as part of the Feast of the Seven Fishes
 Fruitcake
 Gingerbread, often in the form of a gingerbread house or gingerbread man
 Christmas ham
 Hawaiian bread
 Hot buttered rum
 Hot chocolate
 Mashed potatoes
 Mixed nuts, chestnuts, dried figs, dried dates
 Oyster stew, composed of oysters simmered in cream or milk and butter.
 Persimmon pudding
 Pie
 Apple pie
 Pecan pie
 Pumpkin pie
 Sweet potato pie
 Yams/sweet potato casserole (with marshmallow)
 Red velvet cake
 Russian tea cakes
 Tom and Jerry
 Roast turkey, less often roast duck, goose, chicken or pheasant
 Stuffing, also known as dressing, particularly in the southern U.S.
See also: Thanksgiving (the dishes tend to be similar)

Venezuela 

 Hallaca – rectangle-shaped meal made of maize, filled with beef, pork, chicken, olives, raisins and caper, and wrapped in plantain leaves and boiled to cook.
 Pan de jamón – ham-filled bread with olives and raisins and often sliced cheese.
 Dulce de lechosa – dessert made of cooked sliced unripe papaya in reduced sugar syrup
 Ensalada de gallina – salad made of potato, carrot, apple and shredded chicken (hen usually home or locally raised as opposed to store bought chicken)
 Pernil – commonly referred to as roast pork

Vietnam  
 Bánh chưng
 Lẩu

See also 
 Christmas dinner

References

External links 

 

Lists of foods
World cuisine
Lists by country
Dishes